CD Lugo B, previously Sociedad Deportiva e Cultural Polvorín, is a Spanish football team based in Lugo, in the autonomous community of Galicia. Founded in 1991, it plays in Segunda Federación – Group 1, holding home matches at Campo Municipal de A Cheda with a capacity of 1,000 seats.

The club acts as a reserve team of CD Lugo since 2015.

Season to season
As an independent club

As a reserve team

1 season in Segunda Federación
3 seasons in Tercera División
1 season in Tercera División RFEF

Current squad
.

From Youth Academy

Notable players

  Luis Díaz

References

External links
 La Preferente team profile 

Football clubs in Galicia (Spain)
Divisiones Regionales de Fútbol clubs
Association football clubs established in 1991
1991 establishments in Spain
CD Lugo
Spanish reserve football teams